Norman Curtis (born 1933) is a New York-based American pianist and composer.

Works
Revues:
If We Grow Up
Freedom Calling 1967

Recordings
Songs of Innocence album with soprano Peggy Smith 1960

References

1933 births
Living people
American male composers
20th-century American composers
20th-century American pianists
American male pianists
21st-century American pianists
20th-century American male musicians
21st-century American male musicians